Ian Dyk (born 15 September 1985), is an Australian race driver. Starting in Motocross in 1991, he moved into karting in 1996 and has progressed to Formula Ford, Australian Formula 3, Carrera Cup Australia and A1 Grand Prix.

He is now a driver instructor and also a member if the Toyota Hilux Hero's stunt team.

Career results

Complete A1 Grand Prix results
(key) (Races in bold indicate pole position) (Races in italics indicate fastest lap)

References 

 Driver Database profile
 Speedsort bio

1985 births
Living people
Australian people of Dutch descent
Australian racing drivers
Australian Formula 3 Championship drivers
A1 Team Australia drivers
Formula Ford drivers

A1 Grand Prix drivers
Alan Docking Racing drivers